Agron was an Illyrian king of the Ardiaean Kingdom in the 3rd century BC, ruling  250–231 BC. The son of Pleuratus II, Agron succeeded in reconquering southern Illyria, which had been under the control of Epirus since the time of Pyrrhus, and in extending Illyrian rule over many cities in the Adriatic region, including Corcyra, Epidamnos, and Pharos.

He is most famed for his decisive victory over the  Aetolian League, a state in western Greece. Around 231 BC, Agron suddenly died after his triumph over the Aetolians. Pinnes, his son with his first wife Triteuta, officially succeeded his father as king in 231 BC, but the kingdom was ruled by Agron's second wife, Queen Teuta.

History 

Agron was mentioned by two Greek historians, Appian (95–165 AD) in his Foreign Wars and Polybius (203–120 BC) in his Histories. Polybius wrote of him as "Agron, king of the Illyrians, was the son of Pleuratus, and possessed the most powerful force, both by land and sea, of any of the kings who had reigned in Illyria before him." The fact that he was mentioned as the son of another ruler indicates that Agron was a successor who managed to expand the power inherited from his ancestors.
 
Agron extended his rule over other neighboring tribes as well. He annexed part of Epirus, Epidamnus, and the islands of Korkyra (Corfu) and Pharos (Hvar), and garrisoned in them. His state stretched from Narona in Dalmatia south to the river Aoos and Korkyra. During his reign, the Ardiaean state reached the height of its power. The Ardiaean army and fleet made it a major regional power in the Balkans and the southern Adriatic. Agron gained control of the Adriatic with his warships (lembi), a domination once enjoyed by the Liburnians. None of his neighbors were nearly as powerful. Agron gave the city of Pharos to Demetrius of Pharos to rule as its governor.

In 234 BC, the royal succession in Epirus came to an end, and a federal republic was instituted. In the south, the western part of Acarnania seceded from this arrangement. Their independence was soon threatened by the Aetolians, who began to occupy territory around the Gulf of Ambracia, including Pyrrhus' old capital, Ambracia, which forced the Epirotes to establish a new center at Phoenice. Besieged at Medion, the Acarnanians sought assistance from Demetrius II of Macedonia, who for the most of his reign had been at war with the Aetolian and Achaean Leagues. In response, the king brought Agron into the conflict. The Illyrian attack under Agron, mounted in either 232 or 231 BC, is described by Polybius:

The defeat of the Aetolians, famed for their victory over the invading Gauls a generation before, caused a sensation in Illyria. Agron was beside himself with delight when his ships returned and he learned of the victory from his commanders. Agron then drank so much by way of celebration, it was reported, that this and other similar indulgences, brought on an attack of pleurisy which killed him within a few days. Agron died in the winter of 231 BC.

The Greek cities (poleis) on the coast of Illyria were systematically attacked and perhaps already conquered by Agron's forces. Rome answered an appeal from the island of Vis (Issa), threatened by Agron, by sending envoys. They never got there. They were attacked en route by Illyrian vessels, and one of them was killed, together with an Issaean ambassador. Rome thereupon undertook military action against Agron's wife, Teuta, Agron having died in the interim. His son, Pinnes, succeeded him and ruled de jure (though never de facto) for thirteen years. Tritueta was Agron's first wife and the mother of Pinnes. Agron divorced her. Agron's second wife was Queen Teuta, who acted as regent after Agron's death.

See also 
List of rulers of Illyria

References

Bibliography

Further reading 
Dictionary of Greek and Roman Biography and Mythology, ed. by William Smith (1870), pp. 82–83.

Illyrian kings
Year of birth unknown
231 BC deaths
3rd-century BC rulers
Roman-era pirates